All Sorts and Conditions of Men is a 1921 British silent drama film directed by Georges Tréville and starring Renee Kelly, Rex Davis and James Lindsay. It was based on the 1882 novel All Sorts and Conditions of Men by Walter Besant.

Cast
 Renee Kelly - Angela Messenger
 Rex Davis - Harry le Briton 
 James Lindsay - Lord Jocelyn 
 Mary Brough - Landlady

References

External links
 

1921 films
British drama films
British silent feature films
1921 drama films
Ideal Film Company films
Films based on British novels
British black-and-white films
1920s English-language films
1920s British films
Silent drama films